Alicia Dorotea Gamboa Fernández (October 28, 1934–June 24, 2002), better known as Doreen Fernandez, was a noted Filipino writer, teacher, cultural historian, food critic and scholar who wrote extensively about Philippine theatre and Filipino cuisine.

Personal life
Fernandez was born on 28 October 1934 to Aguinaldo Severino Gamboa of Silay, Negros Occidental and Alicia Lucero of Cabanatuan, Nueva Ecija.

She obtained her Bachelor of Arts degree major in English and History in 1954 from St. Scholastica's College, Manila. She completed her Master of Arts degree major in English Literature (1965) and Ph.D. in Literature (1976) from the Ateneo de Manila University.

She died on June 24, 2002 in New York City due to complications of diabetes.

Bibliography

Newspaper columns
 "Pot-au-feu" for the Manila Chronicle
 "In Good Taste" for the Philippine Daily Inquirer
 "Foodscape" for Food Magazine
 "Pot Luck" for Mr. and Ms.

Articles
"What is Filipino Food?" introductory article for The Food of the Philippines book (1999)

"The Filipino Fiesta" introductory article for The Food of the Philippines book (1999)

Books
 The Iloilo Zarzuela, 1903-1930 (1978) 
 Contemporary Theater Arts: Asia and the United States (1984) 
 Sarap: Essays on Philippine Food (1988) 
 Lasa: A Guide to 100 Restaurants (1989) 
 Kinilaw: A Philippine Cuisine of Freshness (1991) 
 Tikim: Essays on Philippine Food and Culture (1994)
 Palabas (1997) 
 Fruits of the Philippines (1997)
 Palayok: Philippine Food Through Time, on Site, in the Pot (2000)

References

 Kirshenblatt-Gimblett, Barbara. (2003). "Doreen G. Fernandez: A Tribute". Gastronomica. Retrieved 2009-10-28.
 Fernandez, Doreen. (1988). Culture Ingested: On the Indigenization of Philippine Food. In E.N. Alegre & D. G. Fernandez (Eds.) Sarap: Essays on Philippine Food. Manila: Mr. & Ms. Publishing Company, Inc.  Retrieved 2009-10-28.
The Food of the Philippines (1999). Periplus Editions.  

1934 births
2002 deaths
Actresses from Negros Occidental
Writers from Negros Occidental
St. Scholastica's College Manila alumni
Ateneo de Manila University alumni
Filipino columnists
Filipino women columnists
Historians of the Philippines
Food historians
Philippine Daily Inquirer people
Deaths from diabetes